Cantagalo may refer to:

São Tomé and Príncipe
Cantagalo District, a district on São Tomé Island

Brazil
Cantagalo, Minas Gerais, a municipality
Cantagalo, Paraná, a municipality
Cantagalo, Rio de Janeiro, a city
Cantagalo, Niterói, a subdivision of Niterói
Cantagalo–Pavão–Pavãozinho, a favela of Rio de Janeiro

See also
 Cantagallo (disambiguation)